The Ministry of National Defense of the Republic of China (MND) is the ministry of the Republic of China (Taiwan) responsible for all defense and military affairs of Taiwan. The MND is headed by Minister Chiu Kuo-cheng.

History 

The MND was originally established as Ministry of War in 1912 at the creation of the Republic of China. It established a military occupation operation center in Taipei, Formosa in November 1945, following the Supreme Commander for the Allied Powers Douglas MacArthur's September 2, 1945 General Order No. 1, for the surrender of Japanese troops and auxiliary forces in Formosa and the Pescadores to Generalissimo Chiang Kai-shek.  It was changed to the Ministry of National Defense in 1946. Military operation activities in Formosa and the Pescadores were expanded after Japan renounced its title, right, and claim to Formosa and the Pescadores based on the April 28, 1952 Treaty of Peace with Japan. The Law of National Defense and the Organic Law of the ministry were officially promulgated for implementation on 1 March 2002.

On 8 December 2014, the ministry moved out from its building from the previous one at Boai Building in Zhongzheng District to the current one in Dazhi area at Zhongshan District, where it houses the Air Force Command Headquarters, Navy Command Headquarters and Heng Shan Military Command Center. The completion of the building had been delayed for nearly two decades due to the compound original architecture and the bankruptcy of the project's original contractor. The planning for the new building and relocation had been done since 1997. The official ribbon-cutting ceremony was held on 27 December 2014.

Headquarters

The headquarters of the military was originally in eastern Nanjing near Ming Palace.
Today it is located in Dazhi area of Zhongshan District in Taipei. The 8-story main building was constructed at a cost of NT$15.8 billion, spreading over 19.5 hectares of area, which houses office buildings, dormitories and other facilities, such as post office, barbershop, sports center, conference hall and sport center to accommodate its 3,000 military personnel stationed there. It also includes several annex buildings around.

The security features of the building include fingerprint and eye scanners that restrict access to certain areas, sensors that can detect vehicles in the unauthorized areas and that may carry explosives and bollards on the compound to block unauthorized vehicles. The compound also has eco-friendly features, such as stone walls, aluminum and low-emission exterior glass panels. The central air conditioning system is provided by ice storage system to reduce peak load electricity demand. The building also has rainwater collecting facilities which can store up to 1,000 tons of water, complete with its waste water treatment and filtering systems.

Budget
In 2016 the annual defense budget for Taiwan was NT$320 billion.

In 2021 the Ministry of National Defense began directly funding defense related research at civilian universities. NT$5 billion (US$147 million) were allocated for the first five years of the program with an initial focus on information security and robotics, artificial intelligence, the internet of things and quantum computing. Previously funding had been allocated through intermediaries with most going to military affiliated research organizations like National Chung-Shan Institute of Science and Technology (NCSIST).

Organizational structure

Headquarter departments 
 Department of Strategic Planning (戰略規劃司)
 Department of Resources Planning (資源規劃司)
 Department of Military Justice (法律事務司)
 Department of Integrated Assessment (整合評估司)
 Office of the Inspector General (總督察長室)
 National Defense Procurement Office (國防採購室)
 Administration Office (政務辦公室)
 Personnel Office (人事室)
 Ethics Office (政風室)
 Accounting Office (主計室)

Secondary or Affiliated authorities 
 Political Warfare Bureau
 Armaments Bureau
 Comptroller Bureau (主計局)
 Medical Affairs Bureau
 All-Out Defense Mobilization Agency

General Staff Headquarters 
 Office of the Deputy Chief of the General Staff for Personnel (人事參謀次長室)
 Office of the Deputy Chief of the General Staff for Intelligence (情報參謀次長室)
 Office of the Deputy Chief of the General Staff for Operations and Planning (作戰及計畫參謀次長室)
 Office of the Deputy Chief of the General Staff for Logistics (後勤參謀次長室)
 Office of the Deputy Chief of the General Staff for Communications, Electronics and Information (通信電子資訊參謀次長室)
 Office of the Deputy Chief of the General Staff  for Training (訓練參謀次長室)
 Communication Development Office (電訊發展室)
 Military Intelligence Bureau (軍事情報局)

Military authorities 
 Army Command Headquarters (陸軍司令部)
 Navy Command Headquarters (海軍司令部)
 Air Force Command Headquarters (空軍司令部)

Military institutions 
 Armed Forces Reserve Command (後備指揮部)
 Military Police Command (憲兵指揮部)
 Information, Communications and Electronic Force Command (資通電軍指揮部)

Affiliated Research Institute  
 National Chung-Shan Institute of Science and Technology(國家中山科學研究院)
 Institute for National Defense and Security Research (國防安全研究院)

List of Ministers of War 

1. Ministers of War during the Republic of China (1912-1928) (歷代陸軍總長)：
 Duan Qirui (段祺瑞)：1912–1915; 1st time
 Zhou Ziqi (周自齊)：1913–1914
 Wang Shizhen (王士珍)：1914–1916; 1st time
 Duan Qirui (段祺瑞)：1916–1917; 2nd time
 Zhang Shiyu (張士鈺)：1917
 Wang Shizhen (王士珍)：1917; 2nd time
 Duan Qirui (段祺瑞)：1917; 3rd time
 Wang Shizhen (王士珍)：1917–1918; 3rd time
 Duan Zhigui (段芝貴)：1918–1919
 Jin Yunpeng (靳雲鵬)：1919–1921; 1st time
 Cai Chengxun (蔡成勛)：1921
 Bao Guiqing (鮑貴卿)：1921–1922
 Wu Peifu (吳佩孚)：1922
 Zhang Shaozeng (張紹增)：1922–1923
 Wang Tan (王坦)：1923; 1st time
 Jin Shaozeng (金紹曾)：1923–1924; 2nd time
 Lu Jin (陸錦)：1924
 Li Shucheng (李書城)：1924
 Wu Guangxin (吳光新)：1924–1925
 Jia Deyao (賈德耀)：1925–1926; Anhui clique
 Zhang Jinghui (張景惠)：1926–1927
 He Fenglin (何豐林)：1927–1928

2. Ministers of War during the National Government of the Republic of China (歷代軍政部長)：
 Feng Yuxiang (馮玉祥)：1928–1929; Kuomintang
 Lu Zhonglin (鹿鍾麟)：1929; Kuomintang
 Chen Yi (陳儀)：1929; Kuomintang
 Lu Zhonglin (鹿鍾麟)：1929; Kuomintang
 Zhu Shouguang (朱綬光)：1929–1930; Kuomintang
 He Yingqin (何應欽)：1930–1944; Kuomintang
 Chen Cheng (陳誠)：1944–1946; Kuomintang

3. Ministers of the Navy during the Republic of China (1912-1928) (歷代海軍總長)：
 Liu Guanxiong (劉冠雄)：1912–1916; 1st time
 Cheng Biguang (程璧光)：1916–1917; 1st time
 Sa Zhenbing (薩鎮冰)：1917; 1st time
 Liu Guanxiong (劉冠雄)：1917–1919; 2nd time
 Sa Zhenbing (薩鎮冰)：1919–1921; 2nd time
 Li Dingxin (李鼎新)：1921–1924; 2nd time
 Du Xigui (杜鍚圭)：1924; 1st time
 Lin Jianzhang (林建章)：1924–1925; 1st time
 Du Xigui (杜鍚圭)：1925–1927; 2nd time

4. Ministers of the Navy during the National Government of the Republic of China (歷代海軍部長)：
 Yang Shuzhuang (楊樹莊)：1929–1932; Kuomintang
 Chen Shaokuan (陳紹寬)：1932–1938; Kuomintang

5. Chiefs of Staff during the Republic of China (1912-1928) (歷代參謀總長):
 Huang Xing (黄興)：1912; 1st time
 Xu Shaozhen(徐紹楨)：1912; 1st time 
 Li Yuanhong (黎元洪)：1912–1915; 1st time
 Feng Guozhang (馮國璋)：1915–1916; 1st time
 Duan Qirui (段祺瑞)：1916; 1st time
 Wang Shizhen (王士珍)：1916–1917; 1st time
 Yin Chang (蔭昌)：1917–1919; 1st time
 Zhang Huaizhi (張懷芝)：1919–1924; 1st time
 Li Liejun (李烈鈞)：1924–1925; 1st time
 Yang Sen (楊森)：1925–1926; 1st time
 Liu Ruxian (劉汝賢)：1926; 1st time
 Liu Xiang (劉湘)：1926–1927; 1st time

6. Chiefs of Staff during the National Government of the Republic of China (歷代參謀總長)：
 Li Jishen (李濟深)：1928–1929; Kuomintang
 He Yingqin (何應欽)：1929; Kuomintang
 Zhu Peide (朱培德)：1929–1932; Kuomintang
 Chiang Kai-shek (蔣中正)：1932–1935; Kuomintang
 Cheng Qian (程潛)：1935–1938; Kuomintang
 He Yingqin (何應欽)：1938–1946; Kuomintang

7. Directors of Training (歷代訓練總監部長)：
 He Yingqin (何應欽)：1928–1931; Kuomintang
 Li Jishen (李濟深)：1931–1933; Kuomintang
 Zhu Peide (朱培德)：1933–1934; Kuomintang
 Tang Shengzhi (唐生智)：1934–1938; Kuomintang
 Bai Chongxi (白崇禧)：1938–1946; Kuomintang

8.  歷代軍事參議院長：
 Li Zongren (李宗仁)：1928–1929; Kuomintang
 Tang Shengzhi (唐生智)：1929–1931; Kuomintang
 Zhang Jinghui (張景惠)：1931; Kuomintang
 Zhang Yipeng (張翼鵬)：1931–1934; Kuomintang
 Chen Tiaoyuan (陳調元)：1934–1943; Kuomintang
 Li Jishen (李濟深)：1943–1945; Kuomintang
 Long Yun (龍雲)：1945–1946; Kuomintang

Ministers of National Defense

See also 
 Chief of the General Staff (Republic of China)
 Chinese Republic Ministry of War
 National Revolutionary Army
 Republic of China Armed Forces
 Republic of China Army
 Republic of China Navy
 Republic of China Marine Corps
 Republic of China Air Force
 Republic of China Military Police

Notes

References

External links 

 Official website of the Ministry of National Defense 
 Official website of the Ministry of National Defense (English)

National Defense
Taiwan (Republic of China)
Military of the Republic of China
Republic of China, National Defense

1951 establishments in Taiwan